Blapsilon viridicolle is a species of beetle in the family Cerambycidae. It was described by Chevrolat in 1858, originally under the genus Tmesisternus. It is known from New Caledonia.

References

Tmesisternini
Beetles described in 1858